A stadium is a large venue for hosting and viewing sports, concerts, and other events.

Stadium may also refer to:

Art and entertainment
 Stadium (album), a 2018 album by Eli Keszler
 Stadium (film), a 1934 Italian film
 Stadium (rock opera), a 1985 composition by Alexander Gradsky
 "The Stadium" (Black Summer), a television episode
 Stadium (sports network), a streaming and broadcast service

Mathematics and technology
 Stadium (geometry), a geometric shape
 Stadium (software), an engineering application for determining the service life of concrete

Places
 The Stadium (cirque), on Elephant Island, South Shetland Islands, Antarctica
 Stadium MRT station, Singapore
 Stadium (UTA station), Salt Lake City, US
 Stadium High School, Tacoma, Washington, US
 Stadium Road or 107 Avenue, Edmonton, Canada

See also 
 
 Stadia (disambiguation)
 Stadion (disambiguation)
 Stadium Arena (disambiguation)
 Stadium station (disambiguation)